Sekkingstad is a village in Øygarden municipality in Vestland county, Norway. It is situated on the west side of the island of Store Sotra. Sekkingstad is the site of the fish factory Vågen Seafood.

References

Villages in Vestland
Øygarden